Valaurie is a commune in the Drôme department in southeastern France. One important landmark is the Church of St. Martin in Valaurie.

Population

See also
Communes of the Drôme department

References

Communes of Drôme